Komati may refer to:

Komati caste, is an ancient Indian trading community primarily found in central and south India.
Komati Power Station, a coal-fired power plant in South Africa.

Geography 

Komati River, a River in South Africa, Eswatini and Mozambique.
Komatiite, a type of ultramafic mantle-derived volcanic rock.